James-Earl Duncan (born June 15, 1977) is a Canadian basketball coach and former player. He served as head coach of the Brisbane Bullets in the National Basketball League (NBL) between June 2021 and November 2022.

Head coaching record

|- 
| style="text-align:left;"|Rizing Fukuoka
| style="text-align:left;"|2014
| 24||15||9|||| style="text-align:center;"|5th in Western|||3||1||2||
| style="text-align:center;"|Lost in 1st round
|- 
| style="text-align:left;"|Rizing Fukuoka
| style="text-align:left;"|2014
| 22||6||16|||| style="text-align:center;"|Fired|||-||-||-||
| style="text-align:center;"|-
|-

References

1977 births
Living people
Rizing Zephyr Fukuoka coaches
Toyama Grouses coaches